Thomas "Tom" Brown is an English former professional rugby union and rugby league footballer who played in the 2000s and 2010s, and has coached rugby union in the 2010s.

International honours
Brown won a cap for Wales (RL) while at Coventry R.F.C. (RU) in 2004.

Outside of rugby
Brown also appeared on ITV's dating game show Take Me Out.

References

External links
Cardiff Blues sign up rugby league's Tom Brown
(archived by web.archive.org) Brown joins the Blues
(archived by web.archive.org) Newport Gwent Dragons profile
(archived by web.archive.org) Dragons bolster forward ranks

1983 births
Living people
Cardiff Rugby players
Coventry R.F.C. players
Dragons RFC players
English people of Welsh descent
English rugby league players
English rugby union coaches
English rugby union players
Footballers who switched code
Gloucestershire Warriors players
London Welsh RFC players
Rugby league players from Doncaster
Rugby league second-rows
Rugby union number eights
Rugby union players from Doncaster
Wales national rugby league team players
Worcester Warriors players